Cody Weightman (born 15 January 2001) is an Australian rules footballer who plays for the Western Bulldogs in the Australian Football League (AFL). He was recruited by the Western Bulldogs with the 15th draft pick in the 2019 AFL draft.

Early life
Weightman was born in Melbourne and grew up on a farm in Beaconsfield, Victoria. He participated in the Auskick program at Officer. Weightman captained his school's first XVIII side at Haileybury, where he was coached by Australian Football Hall of Famer Matthew Lloyd. He also played for the Dandenong Stingrays in the NAB League, and was selected to play for Vic Country in the AFL Under 18 Championships. Weightman played 4 games with Vic Country, and had two stand-out games. His first came against the Allies on 9 June 2019, where he kicked 4 goals, had 16 disposals and 6 marks to help his team to a 97-point victory. He also had another 4-goal haul against South Australia on 28 June 2019, his 4 goals and 12 disposals helping the team get over the line by a singular point. He was selected for the 2019 Under-18 All Australian side on the interchange bench, after he kicked the most goals out of any player in the tournament, finishing with 9 from 4 games. After finishing his schooling, Weightman went to Bali in Indonesia, where he played for the Bali Geckos, describing it as a way to "just to decompress, really,". Weightman was noted as a heavily determined player, reportedly obtaining a vertical jumping test before the AFL Draft Combine in order to perfect his jumping technique to gain an advantage of other potential draftees. Most phantom drafts had Weightman being taken with either Melbourne's 12th pick in the draft, or the Western Bulldogs' 15th pick, and eventually he was taken by the latter.

AFL career
When arriving at the Bulldogs, Weightman donned the number 19 guernsey, the number previously worn by former player Lukas Webb. Weightman debuted in the Bulldogs' 42 point win over the Essendon Bombers in the 7th round of the 2020 AFL season, against friend and former teammate Ned Cahill. In his first game, he picked up 2 goals, 9 disposals and 3 marks. Weightman's first disposal was a banana kick with which he kicked a goal. After kicking just 1 goal in his next two games, Weightman was omitted from the side and did not return for the remainder of the season.

Weightman was kept to the VFL for the start of the 2021 AFL season. He had a standout game in the VFL against Carlton's reserves side, where he took a spectacular mark over Ryley Stoddart which grabbed the attention of seniors coach Luke Beveridge. He kicked two goals in the first quarter, and then kicked the winning goal with only a few minutes remaining by snapping it over his head into the goals. He earned the praise of captain Marcus Bontempelli, who stated "His pressure and his tackling and finishing were exceptional. It's great to see him get some reward." His winning goal earned a Goal of the year nomination for round 9. The next week, Weightman was nominated for the 2021 AFL Rising Star award after his 2 goal, 14 disposal, 11 score-involvement performance against . Weightman had a career best game against , where he kicked four goals, three of them coming in the first quarter. It was revealed Weightman had signed a two-year contract extension with the Western Bulldogs on 20 July 2021, tying him to the club until the end of the 2023 season. Weightman earned a Mark of the Year nomination in round 19, after he took a spectacular mark on top of  ruckman Max Gawn. The mark drew lots of media attention and was branded as a contender to win the annual award. After his 4-goal performance in the final, Weightman was subjected to abuse on social media platforms, prompting teammate Josh Bruce to defend him on Twitter. Unfortunately, he was substituted out of the game for a head knock, after which he developed concussion symptoms, ruling him out of the Preliminary final the following week. After the conclusion of the season, it was revealed that Weightman had played through an ankle injury which he incurred during the pre-season throughout the year.

Personal life
In his spare time, Weightman enjoys wakeboarding and surfing, and has also learned to paint. He grew up supporting .

Statistics
Statistics are correct to the end of the 2021 elimination final 

|- style="background:#EAEAEA"
| scope="row" text-align:center | 2020
| 
| 19 || 3 || 3 || 1 || 11 || 7 || 18 || 4 || 4 || 1.0 || 0.3 || 3.7 || 2.3 || 6.0 || 1.3 || 1.3 || 0
|- 
| scope="row" text-align:center | 2021
| 
| 19 || 14 || 25 || 12 || 114 || 35 || 149 || 47 || 27 || 1.7 || 0.8 || 7.4 || 2.5 || 9.8 || 3.0 || 1.8 || 
|- style="background:#EAEAEA; font-weight:bold; width:2em"
| scope="row" text-align:center class="sortbottom" colspan=3 | Career
| 17
| 28
| 13
| 125
| 42
| 167
| 51
| 31
| 1.7
| 0.8
| 7.4
| 2.5
| 9.8
| 3.0
| 1.8
| 0
|}

References

External links

2001 births
Living people
People educated at Haileybury (Melbourne)
Western Bulldogs players
Australian rules footballers from Melbourne
Dandenong Stingrays players
People from Cardinia